Hemiargyropsis frontalis is a species of tachinid flies in the genus Hemiargyropsis of the family Tachinidae.

External links

Exoristinae